The 2004–05 season will be Ferencvárosi TC's103rd competitive season, 103rd consecutive season in the Borsodi Liga and 105th year in existence as a football club.

Squad

Transfers

Summer

In:

Out:

Source:

Winter

In:

Out:

Source:

Competitions

Overview

Nemzeti Bajnokság I

League table

Results summary

Results by round

Matches

Hungarian Cup

UEFA Champions League

UEFA Cup

Group stage

Appearances and goals
Last updated on 26 May 2005.

|-
|colspan="14"|Youth players:

|-
|colspan="14"|Out to loan:

|-
|colspan="14"|Players no longer at the club:

|}

Top scorers
Includes all competitive matches. The list is sorted by shirt number when total goals are equal.
Last updated on 26 May 2005

Disciplinary record
Includes all competitive matches. Players with 1 card or more included only.

Last updated on 26 May 2005

Clean sheets
Last updated on 26 May 2005

References

External links
 Official Website
 UEFA
 fixtures and results

2004-05
Hungarian football clubs 2004–05 season